Kranspoort is a town in the Makhado Local Municipality in the Limpopo province of South Africa.

Kranspoort was a Dutch Reformed Church mission station from the early 1900s. In 2002, the Kranspoort Mission Station was officially handed over by the "Nederduits-Gereformeerde Kerk van Transvaal" to the Kranspoort Communal Committee. 

Mamphela Ramphele grew up in Kranspoort.

References

Populated places in the Makhado Local Municipality